Mount Ashworth is a peak (2,060 m) 4 nautical miles (7 km) east-northeast of Mount Ford in the Bowers Mountains, Victoria Land, Antarctica. Named by ANARE (Australian National Antarctic Research Expeditions) for Squadron Leader N. Ashworth, RAAF, officer in charge of the RAAF Antarctic Flight with ANARE (Thala Dan), 1962, led by Phillip Law, which explored the area. The mountain lies on the Pennell Coast, a portion of Antarctica lying between Cape Williams and Cape Adare. 

Not to be confused with Mount Ashworth located in Douglas, Massachusetts, United States. Named by town resident Ben Ashworth.

Mountains of Victoria Land
Pennell Coast